Antonio "Tony" DiSpigna (born 1943) is an American type designer and graphic designer.

Early life
DiSpigna was born in Forio d'Ischia, Italy. After emigrating to the United States with his family, he studied at the Pratt Institute, graduating in 1964.

Career
DiSpigna worked alongside Herb Lubalin and Tom Carnase, and has worked independently from his studio since 1973.

DiSpigna is known for his contribution to the design of several typefaces, most famously ITC Serif Gothic and ITC Lubalin Graph; but also many others.

DiSpigna is also known for his hand-drafted Spencerian lettering, a collection of which he published in his book Love Letters.

His career and design work are the subject of the Emmy-winning documentary film Imported from Brooklyn.

DiSpigna has taught at The School of Visual Arts and continues to teach at New York Institute of Technology and Pratt Institute.

References 

American graphic designers
American typographers and type designers
New York Institute of Technology faculty
People from the Province of Naples
Pratt Institute alumni
Pratt Institute faculty
School of Visual Arts faculty
1943 births
Living people